Trent Lucas Sainsbury (born 5 January 1992) is an Australian professional football player who plays as a centre back for Qatari club Al-Wakrah and the Australian national team.

Sainsbury was born in Thornlie, Perth and played youth football with Perth Glory and the Australian Institute of Sport before starting his professional career with Central Coast Mariners. Sainsbury moved to PEC Zwolle in 2014.

Sainsbury has made over 50 appearances for the Australian national team. He was a member of the Australia team which won the 2015 AFC Asian Cup.

Early life
Sainsbury was born in Thornlie, Perth, Western Australia. He attended Forest Crescent Primary School and Kelmscott Senior High School.

Trent started playing football at a very early age at Armadale Junior Soccer Club in Armadale, Western Australia.

Club career

Youth
Sainsbury began his youth career at Perth Glory in 2008 before moving a year later to the AIS where he was part of their National Youth League squad in the 2009–10 season.

Central Coast Mariners

In 2010, Sainsbury was signed by the Central Coast Mariners along with Sam Gallagher. Trent and Mariners teammate Marc Warren were selected to spend two weeks at Sheffield United's Academy as part of the two clubs' partnership. His senior debut came for the Mariners on 24 November 2010 in an F3 Derby draw with Newcastle Jets, with Sainsbury earning praise from coach Graham Arnold for his performance. Trent went on to make a total of nine appearances in the first team that year.

During the successful 2011–12 campaign, it was announced that Sainsbury had signed a two-year contract extension with the club. The Mariners went on to win the 2011–12 A-League Premiership. Trent again made nine league appearances for the club in this season.

After breaking into the first team in the 2012-13 A-League season, Sainsbury formed a formidable partnership alongside Dutch defender Patrick Zwaanswijk. This unit was central in helping the Mariners secure their maiden A-League Championship against Western Sydney Wanderers in the 2013 A-League Grand Final. The Mariners won the game 2–0 in front of 42,102 spectators at the Sydney Football Stadium. Commentator and former Socceroo Mark Bosnich rated Sainsbury as his man of the match. The official award went to Daniel McBreen. Following the game, it was speculated that Sainsbury had attracted serious interest from European clubs including Southampton, Roda JC, Basel and Middlesbrough.

In March 2013, Sainsbury was nominated for the NAB Young Footballer of the Year which was eventually won by Marco Rojas. Sainsbury was named the Mariners Player of the Year for the 2012–13 season. He was also named in the PFA A-League Team of the Season for 2012–13.

After the announcement of the first A-League All Stars match, Sainsbury was considered one of the main contenders for a place in the squad. He did not end up playing in the match due to international selection.

Sainsbury scored his first competitive goal for the Mariners on 3 April 2013, in a win over Guizhou Renhe in the 2013 AFC Champions League, his header with under ten minutes remaining proving to be the winner. His first A-League goal for the side came from a corner in a 2–1 win over Perth Glory in December 2013.

PEC Zwolle

2013–14 season
Sainsbury signed for PEC Zwolle in the Dutch Eredivisie on a two and half year deal in January 2014. Sainsbury was immediately placed in the starting line-up, making his Eredivisie debut on 6 February 2014 in an away game against FC Utrecht. PEC won the game 2–1, but Sainsbury had to be replaced after 72 minutes after falling on a depressed sprinkler, hurting his knee in the process. It was discovered after the match that Sainsbury had fractured his kneecap on the sprinkler, an injury that would end up ruling him out for the remainder of the season. Fellow Australians Tommy Oar and Adam Sarota played in the match for Utrecht.

His club PEC did end the season on a high note when they won their first major trophy in the club's history by defeating league champions Ajax 5–1 in the 2014 KNVB Cup Final, also securing European football for the first time.

2014–15 season
Recovered from his knee injury, Sainsbury was reinstated in PEC's starting lineup for their first game of the season - the 2014 Dutch Supercup. The game was played against the same team that PEC defeated to win the KNVB Cup, 2013–14 league champions Ajax. Sainsbury was part of a defence that kept a clean sheet in a 1–0 win, securing PEC's second major trophy in the club's history in the space of 4 months.

Sainsbury retained his place in the starting line-up for the first league game, at home against FC Utrecht. Lightning would strike again, as Sainsbury was subbed off with an ankle injury after 30 minutes of play, making it the second time in a row Sainsbury was forced out of a league game with an injury, both times against Utrecht. PEC won the game 2–0.

Jiangsu Suning
In January 2016, Sainsbury left PEC Zwolle on a $1.5 million transfer and signed a 3-year deal with Chinese Super League club Jiangsu Suning.

Loan to Inter Milan
On 31 January 2017, it was confirmed that Jiangsu Suning loaned Sainsbury to sister club Inter Milan until 30 June 2017. He made his debut on 28 May 2017 in a 5–2 win over Udinese in the last round of the season, coming on as a substitute for Davide Santon with twenty minutes to play. This made him the first Australian to make a senior appearance for Inter Milan (Nathan Coe and Carl Valeri, former Australian internationals, only played for their reserves).

Loan to Grasshoppers
In February 2018, Sainsbury moved on loan to Grasshoppers for the remainder of the 2017–18 Swiss Super League season.

PSV Eindhoven
In August 2018, Sainsbury signed a 3-year contract with Dutch champions, PSV Eindhoven.

Maccabi Haifa 
On 30 August 2019, Sainsbury departed PSV for Israeli club Maccabi Haifa, joining the club on a two-year contract. Following new coach Barak Bakhar not being impressed with Sainsbury's conduct and following a groin injury during a training camp, Sainsbury was released in August 2020 after 31 appearances in which he scored twice.

Kortrijk 
After leaving Maccabi Haifa, Sainsbury joined Belgian First Division A club Kortrijk on a two-year deal. He scored his first goal for Kortrijk, the final goal in a 5–5 draw against Beerschot on 10 November 2020.

Al-Wakrah 
On 2 August 2022, he signed for Qatari club Al-Wakrah.

International career

Under-17
Sainsbury was a member of the Australia U-17 team which attended the 2008 AFF U-16 Youth Championship. The team won the tournament after beating Bahrain in a penalty shootout in the final. He was also a member of the squad for the 2008 AFC U-16 Championship, scoring a goal in a loss to UAE in the quarter-finals which saw Australia miss out on qualification for the 2009 FIFA U-17 World Cup.

Under-20
Sainsbury was selected in Australia's squad for the 2011 FIFA U-20 World Cup where Australia finished bottom of their group with one draw and two losses. He played in all three of Australia's matches.

Senior

In May 2013, Trent was selected in a Socceroos Australian-based training squad for upcoming World Cup qualifiers. In July 2013, he made Australia's squad for the 2013 EAFF East Asian Cup. Despite strong club form, Sainsbury was the only outfield player in the squad not to be used by coach Holger Osieck in the tournament, which he suggested may have been due to Osieck mistaking his laid-back attitude for a lack of commitment.

Sainsbury's chances of playing in the 2014 FIFA World Cup were ultimately ended by a knee injury suffered playing for PEC Zwolle.

In September 2014, Sainsbury made his International debut for Australia in a 2–0 loss to Belgium in a friendly. He later admitted to having been nervous before the game but earned praise from coach Ange Postecoglou for his performance against a strong opponent.

Sainsbury was selected as part of Australia's 2015 AFC Asian Cup squad. He started in Australia's first group game against Kuwait, a match which Australia won 4-1. He also started Australia's second group game against Oman, providing the assist for Matt McKay to open the scoring in a 4-0 win by heading a Massimo Luongo corner goalwards. Sainsbury scored his first ever international goal in the semi-final against the United Arab Emirates. Under three minutes into the game, he headed a corner from Massimo Luongo in at the far post to give Australia the lead in a match they ultimately won 2–0. He also played for Australia in the Final victory over South Korea and was named as Man of the Match following an imposing defensive display. Trent was named in the official team of the tournament after a number of solid performances.

In May 2018, he was named in Australia's 23-man squad for the 2018 FIFA World Cup in Russia. In November 2022, he was not included in Australia's 26-man squad for the 2022 FIFA World Cup in Qatar.

Personal life
Sainsbury's partner, Elissa, is the daughter of Australian football manager and current Socceroos coach Graham Arnold.

In addition to holding an Australian passport, Sainsbury also holds a UK passport.

Career statistics

Club

International

As of match played 7 June 2021. Australia score listed first, score column indicates score after each Sainsbury goal.

Honours

Club
Central Coast Mariners
 A-League Premiership: 2011–12
 A-League Championship: 2012–13

PEC Zwolle
 KNVB Cup: 2013–14
 Johan Cruijff Shield: 2014

International
Australia
 AFC Asian Cup: 2015
 AFF U-16 Youth Championship: 2008

Individual
 Mariners Medal: 2012–13
 PFA A-League Team of the Season: 2012–13
 2015 AFC Asian Cup Man of the Match: Final vs. South Korea
 AFC Asian Cup Team of the Tournament: 2015

See also
 List of Central Coast Mariners FC players
 List of foreign football players in the Netherlands

References

External links

Trent Sainsbury at Aussie Footballers

1992 births
Living people
Soccer players from Perth, Western Australia
Australian soccer players
Australia youth international soccer players
Australia under-20 international soccer players
Australian Institute of Sport soccer players
Australian people of English descent
Central Coast Mariners FC players
PEC Zwolle players
Jiangsu F.C. players
Inter Milan players
Grasshopper Club Zürich players
PSV Eindhoven players
Maccabi Haifa F.C. players
K.V. Kortrijk players
Al-Wakrah SC players
A-League Men players
Eredivisie players
Chinese Super League players
Serie A players
Swiss Super League players
Israeli Premier League players
Belgian Pro League players
Qatar Stars League players
Australian expatriate soccer players
Australian expatriate sportspeople in Switzerland
Expatriate footballers in the Netherlands
Australian expatriate sportspeople in the Netherlands
Expatriate footballers in China
Australian expatriate sportspeople in China
Expatriate footballers in Italy
Australian expatriate sportspeople in Italy
Expatriate footballers in Israel
Australian expatriate sportspeople in Israel
Expatriate footballers in Belgium
Australian expatriate sportspeople in Belgium
Expatriate footballers in Qatar
Australian expatriate sportspeople in Qatar
2015 AFC Asian Cup players
2017 FIFA Confederations Cup players
AFC Asian Cup-winning players
Association football central defenders
2018 FIFA World Cup players
Australia international soccer players
2019 AFC Asian Cup players